Shadiabad (also Romanized as Shādīābād) is a village in Raviz Rural District, Koshkuiyeh District, Rafsanjan County, Kerman Province, Iran. At the 2006 census, its population was 8, in 4 families.

References 

Populated places in Rafsanjan County